Josip Topić (born October 22, 1982 in Bugojno) is a Bosnian-Herzegovinian retired footballer.

He played the last years of his career in the Austrian lower leagues.

References

External links

Schwanenstadt: Wieder kehrte ein Stück vom alten Glanz zurück, nachrichten.at, 30 June 2014
Zu- und Abgänge bei Union Thalheim, Winter 2014-15, unionthalheim.at
Union Thalheim website‚ unionthalheim.at

1982 births
Living people
People from Bugojno
Croats of Bosnia and Herzegovina
Association football defenders
Bosnia and Herzegovina footballers
Bosnia and Herzegovina under-21 international footballers
NK Solin players
HŠK Posušje players
NK Široki Brijeg players
NK Imotski players
SC Schwanenstadt players
Premier League of Bosnia and Herzegovina players
First Football League (Croatia) players
Bosnia and Herzegovina expatriate footballers
Expatriate footballers in Croatia
Bosnia and Herzegovina expatriate sportspeople in Croatia
Expatriate footballers in Austria
Bosnia and Herzegovina expatriate sportspeople in Austria